Romualdo Migliorini (born 21 Jun 1884 in Volegno) was an Italian clergyman and bishop for the Roman Catholic Diocese of Manzini. He was ordained in 1901. He was appointed in 1933. He died in 1953.

References 

Italian Roman Catholic bishops
1884 births
1953 deaths